The Rivière des Mères is a tributary of the south shore of the Saint Lawrence River. This watercourse flows in the municipalities of Saint-Michel-de-Bellechasse and Saint-Vallier, in the Bellechasse Regional County Municipality, in the administrative region of Chaudière-Appalaches, in Quebec, in Canada.

The surface of the rivière des Mères is generally frozen from the beginning of December until the end of March, except for the rapids areas; however, safe circulation on the ice is generally done from mid-December to mid-March. The water level of the river varies with the seasons and the precipitation; the spring flood occurs in March or April.

Geography 

The Rivière des Mères rises on the northwest side of the railway, in the 3th rang west, in Saint-Michel-de-Bellechasse. This river flows northeast, more or less in parallel (on the southeast side) to the Boyer River and the Blanche River.

  north-east, passing from the north-west side of the village of La Durantaye, to route 281;
  north-east, up to the limit of Saint-Michel-de-Bellechasse and Saint-Vallier;
  north-east, up to the bridge of highway 20;
  towards the north-east, collecting the waters of the Blanche river "(coming from the south), up to the path" Montée de la Station ";
  north-east, to route 132;
  north-east, to its confluence.

The Mères river flows onto the long shore in the eastern part of Berthier cove, on the south bank of the St. Lawrence River. This confluence is located on the west side of the village of Berthier-sur-Mer, on the east side of the village of Saint-Vallier and opposite the village of Saint-Jean-de-l'Île-d'Orléans located on Île d'Orléans. This confluence is located east of the confluence of the Boyer River.

Toponymy 
The name of this watercourse evokes the work of the Augustine sisters of the General Hospital of Quebec, who owned the seigneury of Saint-Vallier.

The toponym Rivière des Mères was formalized on December 5, 1968 at the Commission de toponymie du Québec.

See also 

 List of rivers of Quebec

Notes and references 

Tributaries of the Saint Lawrence River
Rivers of Chaudière-Appalaches